And the Saved World Remembers is a monumental painting by Belarusian artist Mai Dantsig measuring  and based on the Sistine Madonna by Raphael Sanzio. Dantsig was inspired by the salvage of the Sistine Madonna  from the bombing of Dresden during World War II. And the Saved World Remembers depicts the moment when the Sistine Madonna was retrieved by the Soviets. The background shows an army, the left side depicts a postman delivering news of victory amid ruined cities and the right side shows German soldiers among concentration camps. The painting also shows women lamenting their dead and a mine detector. Dantsig spent over ten years working on the painting and completed it in 1985, during the 40th anniversary of the end of World War II in Europe.

In 2015, And the Saved World Remembers was exhibited in the Saatchi Gallery in London.

See also
Partisan Madonna of Minsk
Art and World War II

References

Paintings of the Madonna and Child
1985 paintings
Belarusian art
World War II in popular culture